SMA Negeri 1 Purwakarta is a school in Purwakarta, Jawa Barat, Indonesia.

External links

Schools in Indonesia
Education in West Java